is an interchange railway station in the city of Matsudo, Chiba, Japan, operated by East Japan Railway Company (JR East) and the private railway company Shin-Keisei Electric Railway.

Lines
Matsudo Station is served by the Jōban Line and is 15.7 km from the terminus of the line at Nippori Station in Tokyo. It is also the terminus for the Shin-Keisei Line and is 26.5 kilometers from the opposing terminus at Keisei Tsudanuma Station.

Station layout
The station consists of four island platforms serving eight tracks. The JR portion of the station has a Midori no Madoguchi staffed ticket office.

Platforms

History
Matsudo Station opened on December 25, 1896 as a station on the Nippon Railway Tsuchiura Line. It was nationalised on November 1, 1906, becoming part of the Japanese Government Railways (JGR) and the line name changed on October 12, 1909 to the Jōban Line. JGR became Japanese National Railways (JNR) after World War II. The Shin-Keisei Line began operations from April 21, 1955. The station was absorbed into the JR East network upon the privatization of JNR on April 1, 1987.

Passenger statistics
In fiscal 2019, the JR East station was used by an average of 100,062 passengers daily (boarding passengers only), making it the 39th-busiest station operated by JR East.  In fiscal 2019, the Shin-Keisei Electric Railway station was used by an average of 105,704 passengers daily (boarding passengers only), making it the busiest station operated by the company. The daily passenger figures (boarding passengers only) for the JR East station in previous years are as shown below.

Surrounding area
 Seitoku University
 Tojogaoka Historic Park
 Matsudo City Hall

See also
 List of railway stations in Japan

References

External links

 JR East Station information 
 Shin Keisei Station Information 

Railway stations in Japan opened in 1896
Railway stations in Chiba Prefecture
Jōban Line
Stations of East Japan Railway Company
Matsudo